Tutufa bardeyi is a species of sea snail, a marine gastropod mollusk in the family Bursidae, the frog shells.

Description
The length of the shell varies between 75 mm and 430 mm. This quite rare shell is the largest known in Bursidae species. It is thick and heavy, with a deeply notched siphonal canal at the end of a wide whitish or slightly yellowish or pinkish aperture. The outer lip is relatively thin, with a wavy edge. The surface color may be almost white or pale brown and shows broad, prominent ribs, closely adjacent to each other.

Distribution
This marine species occurs in the Gulf of Aden, Somalia, Kenya and Tanzania.

References

 Spry, J.F. (1961). The sea shells of Dar es Salaam: Gastropods. Tanganyika Notes and Records 56
 Muehlhausser, H., 1988: Remarks on Tutufa boholica Tutufa bardeyi Gastropoda: Bursidae. Conchiglia,

External links
 
 WMSD - Worldwide mollusc species DB
  School Collection
 Shells from sea

Bursidae
Gastropods described in 1881
Taxa named by Félix Pierre Jousseaume